Valentyna Ksenofontivna Rastvorova (17 July 1933 – 24 August 2018) was a Soviet fencer who competed at the 1956, 1960 and 1964 Olympics in the individual and team foil events. She won a team gold and individual silver medals in 1960, and team silver medal in 1964. She also won six gold and two silver medals at the world championships of 1956–1967, mostly in the team foil.

In 1956 Rastvorova graduated from the Russian State University of Physical Education, Sport, Youth and Tourism. After retiring from competitions she worked as a fencing coach at her club Dynamo Moscow.

She was married to Boris Grishin, an Olympic water polo player. Their son, Yevgeny Grishin, is an Olympic champion in water polo. Her daughter, Yelena Grishina, made it to the finals of the Olympics in foil in 1992 and 1988. Her grandson, Sergey Bida, is a world champion epee fencer.

References

1933 births
2018 deaths
Russian female foil fencers
Ukrainian female foil fencers
Soviet female foil fencers
Olympic fencers of the Soviet Union
Fencers at the 1956 Summer Olympics
Fencers at the 1960 Summer Olympics
Fencers at the 1964 Summer Olympics
Olympic gold medalists for the Soviet Union
Olympic silver medalists for the Soviet Union
Olympic medalists in fencing
Medalists at the 1960 Summer Olympics
Medalists at the 1964 Summer Olympics
Sportspeople from Odesa